Glycogen synthase kinase-3 alpha is an enzyme that in humans is encoded by the GSK3A gene.

Glycogen synthase kinase 3-alpha  is a multifunctional protein serine kinase, homologous to Drosophila 'shaggy' (zeste-white3) and implicated in the control of several regulatory proteins including glycogen synthase and various transcription factors (e.g., JUN). It also plays a role in the WNT and phosphoinositide 3-kinase (especially PIK3CG) signaling pathways.

Model organisms

Model organisms have been used in the study of GSK3A function. A conditional knockout mouse line, called Gsk3atm1a(EUCOMM)Wtsi was generated as part of the International Knockout Mouse Consortium program — a high-throughput mutagenesis project to generate and distribute animal models of disease to interested scientists.

Male and female animals underwent a standardized phenotypic screen to determine the effects of deletion. Twenty one tests were carried out on mutant mice but no significant abnormalities were observed.

See also 
 Glycogen synthase kinase 3

References 

Protein kinases
EC 2.7.11
Genes mutated in mice